Sue Miller (born November 29, 1943) is an American novelist and short story writer who has written a number of best-selling novels.

Biography
Born in Chicago, Miller was preoccupied with her duties as a single mother, leaving little time to write for many years. As a result, she did not publish her first novel until 1986, after spending almost a decade in various fellowships and teaching positions.

Since then, two of her novels have been made into feature films, and her book While I Was Gone was an Oprah's Book Club pick in 2000. Miller has taught creative writing classes at Smith College, Amherst, Tufts, MIT, and Boston University.

Selected works

Novels
 The Good Mother: a novel (1986) , made into a movie in 1988
 Family Pictures: a novel (1990) 
 For Love: a novel (1993) 
 The Distinguished Guest: a novel (1995) 
 While I Was Gone: a novel (1999) 
 The World Below: a novel  (2001) 
 Lost in the Forest: a novel (2005) 
 The Senator's Wife: a novel (2008) 
 The Lake Shore Limited: a novel (2010)  
 The Arsonist: a novel (2014)  
 Monogamy: a novel (2020)

Short story collections
 Inventing the Abbotts and Other Stories (1987) , made into a movie in 1997

Memoirs
 The Story of My Father (2003)

References

External links
 Author website
 Reading from The Senator's Wife by Sue Miller at the Portland (Maine) Public Library, January 2008.

1943 births
Living people
20th-century American novelists
21st-century American novelists
American women novelists
Boston University faculty
Smith College faculty
Writers from Chicago
20th-century American women writers
21st-century American women writers
20th-century American short story writers
American women short story writers
Novelists from Illinois
Novelists from Massachusetts
American women academics